Pass the Buck may refer to:

 Buck passing, or passing the buck, attributing to another person or group one's own responsibility
 "Passing the buck", in poker, passing the button (or buck) to the next dealer
 Pass the Buck (American game show), 1978 
 Pass the Buck (1986 British game show)
 Pass the Buck (1998 British game show)
 Pass the Buck (Australian game show), 2002 
 Pass the Buck (The Price Is Right), a pricing game on The Price Is Right
 "Pass the Buck", a song by Stereophonics from the 2007 album Pull the Pin